Eunice Irene Pringle (born March 5, 1912, Garden Grove, California — died March 26, 1996) was an aspiring dancer, notable for accusing Los Angeles movie-house owner Alexander Pantages of rape in 1929, resulting in a sensational trial.

1929 trial 
Pringle alleged that Pantages had attacked her on August 9, 1929 in a tiny side-office of his downtown theater after she came to see him to discuss her audition. Newspaper coverage of the trial, particularly by William Randolph Hearst's Los Angeles Examiner, was antagonistic towards the Greek-accented Pantages, while portraying Pringle as the innocent victim. 

In countless stories in the Examiner from the moment the case broke in the newspaper on Saturday, August 10, 1929, until the end of the trial, Pantages was portrayed as variously alone, aloof, cold, emotionless, effete, and European, while the American-born Pringle was portrayed as "the sweetest 17 since Clara Bow". There were portraits with her family, tearful outbursts in court and lengthy interviews in the press, which depicted her with a sense of decorum and empathy. Pantages gave no interviews during the trial.

Pantages was found guilty and he was sentenced to 50 years in prison.
However, his conviction was overturned on appeal.

Hollywood myths have alleged that  Joseph P. Kennedy, the patriarch of the famous American family, paid Pringle $10,000 to enter Pantages's office and accuse him of rape, with the goal of destroying his reputation and business prospects and forcing Pantages to accept Kennedy's bid to buy Pantages's  theatre chain.  Pantages had adamantly refused to sell when Kennedy initially approached him.

Later years

The conviction destroyed Pantages's reputation. Despite his success on appeal, he sold his chain to Kennedy's RKO and Warner Bros. After the incident, Pringle withdrew from show business.

A story later circulated that Pringle implicated Kennedy in a deathbed confession in the throes of evident cyanide poisoning soon after the trial. The alleged incident is described in Ronald Kessler's biography of Kennedy, Sins of the Father, as well as in Kenneth Anger's Hollywood Babylon II.  

In 1935, Pringle married Robert White, the heir to a furniture business. After divorcing White, she married Richard Ellis Worthington, a psychologist, in 1947. They lived in Chicago for several years before moving to San Diego County in 1955. The couple had one child, a daughter, Marcy. Pringle died in 1996, aged 84.

References

1912 births
1996 deaths
People from Garden Grove, California
Actresses from California
People from San Diego County, California
20th-century American actresses